Insulasaurus wrighti, also known commonly as Wright's sphenomorphus, is a species of skink, a lizard in the family Scincidae. The species is endemic to Palawan in the Philippines.

Etymology
The specific name, wrighti, is in honor of American philanthropist John Dutton Wright (1866–1952), who financed Taylor's collecting trip to Palawan.

Habitat

Description

Reproduction
The mode of reproduction of I. wrighti is unknown.

References

Further reading
Linkem CW, Diesmos AC, Brown RM (2011). "Molecular systematics of the Philippine forest skinks (Squamata: Scincidae: Sphenomorphus): testing morphological hypotheses of interspecific relationships". Zoological Journal of the Linnean Society 163: 1217–1243.
Taylor EH (1925). "Additions to the Herpetological Fauna of the Philippines, IV". Philippine Journal of Science 26: 97–111. (Insulasaurus wrighti, new species, p. 103).

Insulasaurus
Reptiles of the Philippines
Endemic fauna of the Philippines
Fauna of Palawan
Reptiles described in 1925
Taxa named by Edward Harrison Taylor